The Canberra International  (sponsored by Richard Luton Properties), was a women's tennis tournament held in Canberra, Australia. The event was affiliated with the Women's Tennis Association (WTA), and was classed variously as a Tier III (2001), a Tier V (2002–2005), and a Tier IV (2006) on the WTA Tour. It was competed on outdoor hardcourts. The event was intended to be one of the build-up tournaments to the first Grand Slam event of the year, the Australian Open.

The tournament was held at the National Sports Club in the Northern Canberra suburb of Lyneham and was played on Rebound Ace hardcourts. A singles  and doubles competition was held each year. The singles prize winner received US$16,000 and 95 tournament points. Justine Henin and Ana Ivanovic, both of whom went on to win Grand Slam titles and become World No.1, were amongst the singles champions.

Past finals

Singles

Doubles

See also
List of tennis tournaments

External links
 Official website

 
Sports competitions in Canberra
WTA Tour
Recurring sporting events established in 2001
Recurring sporting events disestablished in 2006